George Owino Audi (born 24 April 1981 in Nairobi) is a Kenyan footballer who is currently playing for Sofapaka in the Kenyan Premier League.

Career
Owino had been playing for Simba SC in Tanzania since 2007. Before moving to Tanzania, he played for Tusker FC. In July 2008 he joined Saint-George SA. In July 2009 he was invited to train with Fortuna Düsseldorf on advice from Antoine Hey, his dream is to play in Europe. On 28 July 2009 he signed for Fortuna Düsseldorf. His transfer failed and he re-signed for Saint-George SA, he signed then on 18 August 2009 with Tanzanian club Young Africans FC. On 1 July 2010 he left Young Africans FC, returned to Kenya, and signed for Sofapaka.

International career
Owino is member of the Kenya national football team and played 16 games here.

Controversy
In February 2019 Owino was named in a FIFA report that alleged he had been involved in match fixing. In April 2019 he was one of four African former international footballers banned for life by FIFA due to "match manipulation".

References

1981 births
Living people
Footballers from Nairobi
Kenyan footballers
Association football midfielders
Association football utility players
Simba S.C. players
Tusker F.C. players
Sofapaka F.C. players
Saint George S.C. players
Kenya international footballers
Expatriate footballers in Tanzania
Expatriate footballers in Ethiopia
Tanzanian Premier League players